Peter or Pete Collins may refer to:

People 
 Peter B. Collins (born c. 1954), American broadcaster
 Peter Collins (academic) (born 1945), British academic
 Peter Collins (New South Wales politician) (born 1947), Leader of the Opposition of New South Wales, 1995–1998
 Peter Collins (Victorian politician) (born 1941), member of the Victorian Legislative Assembly
 Peter Collins (broadcaster) (born 1964), Irish sportscaster
 Peter Collins (bishop) (born 1958), Roman Catholic Bishop of East Anglia
 Peter Collins (footballer) (born 1948), English footballer
 Peter Collins (organ builder) (1941–2015), English pipe organ builder
 Peter Collins (racing driver) (1931–1958), English racing driver
 Peter Collins (record producer) (born 1951), English record producer
 Peter Collins (speedway rider) (born 1954), English former speedway rider
 Peter Collins (racing team manager) (born 1950), former racing team manager for the Lotus and Benetton Formula One teams

Other uses 
 Pete Collins, fictional character in British soap opera, Emmerdale
 Pete Collins, fictional character in Australian soap opera Neighbours
 Peter Collins (slang), designating a nonexistent person to whom a newcomer was sent on an errand as a kind of initiation

See also 
Peter K. Cullins (1928–2012), American admiral

Collins, Peter